VirtualSchoolBC is an online school offering free secondary school courses to British Columbia residents. It is headquartered in Westminster, British Columbia, Canada.

VirtualSchoolBC is a public school within School District 40 New Westminster.  It is funded by the Ministry of Education of British Columbia. Students who complete courses may add them to or complete a graduation plan.

VirtualSchoolBC uses BlackBoard Learn to deliver continuous entry courses. It is a member of LearnNowBC.

Background 
In 1998 a group of teachers began offering continuous entry high school courses online using WebCT. In 2006. WebCT was bought by BlackBoard . VirtualschoolBC ported their courses to BlackBoard Learn.

References

External links 

LearnNowBC

Online schools in Canada
High schools in British Columbia
Educational institutions in Canada with year of establishment missing
Education in New Westminster